Shemen may refer to:

Places in Israel
Ben Shemen
Kerem Ben Shemen

Oil
 Shemen (bible), a commonly used word for oil in the Hebrew scriptures
 Shemen Afarsimon, an oil used in antiquity
 Shemen HaMishcha, Hebrew for Anointing Oil, mentioned in the Old Testament